Finland competed at the 2022 World Games held in Birmingham, United States from 7 to 17 July 2022. Athletes representing Finland won one silver medal and one bronze medal. The country finished in 60th place in the medal table.

Medalists

Competitors
The following is the list of number of competitors in the Games.

Aerobic gymnastics

Finland competed in aerobic gymnastics.

Air sports

Finland competed in drone racing.

Archery

Finland competed in archery.

Dancesport

Finland competed in dancesport.

Floorball

Finland won the silver medal in the floorball tournament.

Summary

Group play

Semifinal

Gold medal game

Karate

Finland competed in karate.

Kickboxing

Finland won one bronze medal in kickboxing.

Muaythai

Finland competed in muaythai.

Orienteering

Finland competed in orienteering.

Powerlifting

Finland competed in powerlifting.

Rhythmic gymnastics

Finland competed in rhythmic gymnastics.

Squash

Finland competed in squash.

Sumo

Finland competed in sumo.

References

Nations at the 2022 World Games
2022
World Games